Drinking with My Smoking Friends is the fourth studio album by Australian rapper Allday, released on 28 May 2021 via Believe Music. The album was announced on 10 March 2021, alongside the release of second single "Void", and tour dates in August 2021.

Drinking with My Smoking Friends received critical acclaim following its release and peaked at number 13 on the ARIA Albums Chart.

Background
In a press release, Allday said, "Drinking with My Smoking Friends is about escaping something and finding something new, whether that's a place, a relationship or something else."

Critical reception

Drinking with My Smoking Friends received critical acclaim.

Poppy Reid from Rolling Stone Australia said "In a world starved of human connection mid-pandemic, where even the simplest comforts are compromised, Drinking with My Smoking Friends reminds us to bathe in our own delicious weariness. It's Gaynor's most unguarded album yet, a landmark of breezy sophistication."

Mid-year lists

Track listing

Charts

Release history

Notes

References

2021 albums
Allday albums